Nastassia Novikava (born 16 November 1981 in Zhodzina, Byelorussian SSR) is a world championship winning weightlifter from Belarus.

Career
At the 2004 Summer Olympics Novikava ranked fifth in the 53 kg class. At the 2007 World Weightlifting Championships she won the silver medal in the 53 kg class, lifting a total of 213 kg.

She initially won the bronze medal in the women's 53 kg event at the 2008 Summer Olympics.

After 2008, Novikava moved up to the -58 kg category.

She won the 2010 European Championship with a personal best of 238 kg.  In 2011, she won the world championship with a total of 237 kg.

At the 2012 Summer Olympics, she finished 7th with a total of 230 kg.

In 2016, she was stripped of her 2008 Olympic medal after a retest of her doping sample tested positive for steroids.

Notes and references

External links
Athlete bio at official Olympics site

1981 births
Living people
People from Zhodzina
Belarusian female weightlifters
Weightlifters at the 2004 Summer Olympics
Weightlifters at the 2008 Summer Olympics
Weightlifters at the 2012 Summer Olympics
Olympic weightlifters of Belarus
World Weightlifting Championships medalists
Belarusian sportspeople in doping cases
Doping cases in weightlifting
Competitors stripped of Summer Olympics medals
European Weightlifting Championships medalists
Sportspeople from Minsk Region